The 2016 ITF Women's Circuit – Wuhan was a professional tennis tournament played on outdoor hard courts. It was the 3rd edition of the tournament and part of the 2016 ITF Women's Circuit, offering a total of $50,000 in prize money. It took place in Wuhan, China, on 25–31 July 2016.

Singles main draw entrants

Seeds 

 1 Rankings as of 18 July 2016.

Other entrants 
The following player received a wildcard into the singles main draw:
  Cao Siqi
  Gai Ao
  Guo Shanshan
  Sheng Yuqi

The following players received entry from the qualifying draw:
  Hsu Ching-wen
  Junri Namigata
  Akiko Omae
  Sun Ziyue

Champions

Singles

 Wang Qiang def.  Luksika Kumkhum, 7–5, 6–2

Doubles

 Shuko Aoyama /  Makoto Ninomiya def.  Chang Kai-chen /  Duan Yingying, 6–4, 6–4

External links 
 2016 ITF Women's Circuit – Wuhan at ITFtennis.com
 Official website

2016 ITF Women's Circuit
2016 in Chinese tennis
2016